The 2nd Minnesota Cavalry Regiment was a Minnesota USV cavalry regiment that served in the Union Army during the American Civil War.

The 2nd Minnesota Cavalry Regiment was mustered at Fort Snelling, Minnesota. for three year's service on December 5, 1863, and were mustered out on November 17, 1865, and May 4, 1866. It served entirely in Minnesota, Dakota Territory, and Montana Territory guarding the frontier against the Sioux Indians.

Battles and campaigns
Battle of Tah Kah A Kuty or Killdeer Mountain, July 28, 1864.
Action at Two Hills, Bad Lands, Little Missouri River, August 8 to 9, 1864.
Rescue of Fisk's Emigrant train at Fort Dilts, September 10 to 30,1864.

Colonels
 Colonel Robert Neill McLaren

Casualties and total strength
The 2nd Minnesota Cavalry had 4 enlisted men killed in action or died of wounds received in battle and an additional 3 officers and 56 enlisted men died of disease. Total fatalities were 63.

War Poet
At the outbreak of the American Civil War, Edward Thomas, a Welsh-language war poet native to Centerville, Ohio and whose Bardic name was Awenydd, was living and working as a schoolmaster at the Welsh-American farming settlement at South Bend Township, in Blue Earth County, Minnesota. In 1862, he enlisted in Company E of the 2nd Minnesota Cavalry Regiment. During his military service, Thomas wrote many Welsh language poems, including Pryddest ar Wir Fawredd, which later won the Bardic Crown at an Eisteddfod held in Minersville, Pennsylvania. Following the end of the war, Thomas became a Presbyterian minister.

References

External links
The Civil War Archive Website
Narrative of the Minnesota Second Regiment of Cavalry
Map of General Sully's 1864 Campaign
 Minnesota Historical Society page on Minnesota and the Civil War

See also
List of Minnesota Civil War Units

2nd Minnesota Volunteer Cavalry Regiment
1863 establishments in Minnesota
Military units and formations established in 1863
Military units and formations disestablished in 1866